Canadian raising (also sometimes known as English diphthong raising) is an allophonic rule of phonology in many varieties of North American English that changes the pronunciation of diphthongs with open-vowel starting points. It is thought to have originated in Canada in the late 19th century.

Description

Phonetic environment

However, several studies indicate that this rule is not completely accurate, and have attempted to formulate different rules.

A study of three speakers in Meaford, Ontario, showed that pronunciation of the diphthong  fell on a continuum between raised and unraised. Raising is influenced by voicing of the following consonant, but it may also be influenced by the sound before the diphthong. Frequently the diphthong was raised when preceded by a coronal: in gigantic, dinosaur, and Siberia.

Raising before , as in wire, iris, and fire, has been documented in some American accents.

Raising of  before certain voiced consonants is most prominent in the Inland North, Western New England, and Philadelphia. It has been noted to occur before ,  and  especially. Hence, words like tiny, spider, cider, tiger, dinosaur, cyber-, beside, idle (but sometimes not idol), and fire  may contain a raised nucleus. (Also note that in six of those nine words,  is preceded by a coronal consonant; see above paragraph. In five [or possibly six] of those nine words, the syllable after the syllable with  contains a liquid.) Hence, some researchers have argued that there has been a phonemic split in these dialects; the distribution of the two sounds is becoming more unpredictable among younger speakers.

Raising can apply to compound words.  Hence, the first vowel in high school  as a term meaning "a secondary school for students approximately 14–18 years old" may be raised, whereas high school  with the literal meaning of "a school that is high (e.g. in elevation)" is unaffected. (The two terms are also distinguished by the position of the stress accent, as shown.) The same is true of "high chair".

However, frequently it does not. One study of speakers in Rochester, New York and Minnesota found a very inconsistent pattern of  raising before voiceless consonants in certain prefixes; for example, the numerical prefix bi- was raised in bicycle but not bisexual or bifocals. Likewise, the vowel was consistently kept low when used in a prefix in words like dichotomy and anti-Semitic. This pattern may have to do with stress or familiarity of the word to the speaker; however, these relations are still inconsistent.

In accents with both flapping and Canadian raising,  or  before a flapped  may still be raised, even though the flap is a voiced consonant. Hence, while in accents without raising, writer and rider are pronounced identically except for a slight difference in vowel length due to pre-fortis clipping, in accents with raising, the words may be distinguished by their vowels: writer , rider .

Result
The raised variant of  typically becomes , while the raised variant of  varies by dialect, with  more common in Western Canada and a fronted variant  commonly heard in Central Canada. In any case, the open vowel component of the diphthongs changes to a mid vowel (or ).

Geographic distribution

Inside Canada
As its name implies, Canadian raising is found throughout most of Canada, though the exact phonetic quality of Canadian raising may differ throughout the country. In raised , the first element tends to be farther back in Quebec and the Canadian Prairies and Maritimes (particularly in Alberta): thus, . The first element tends to be the farthest forward in eastern and southern Ontario: thus, .

Outside Canada
Canadian raising is not restricted to Canada. South Atlantic English and the accents of England's Fens feature it as well.

This phenomenon is most consistently found in the Inland North, the Upper Midwest, New England, New York City, and the mid-Atlantic areas of Pennsylvania (including Philadelphia), Maryland, and Delaware, as well as in Virginia. It is somewhat less common in the lower Midwest, the West, and the South.

See also

Canadian Shift
North American English regional phonology
North-Central American English

Notes

Bibliography

 
 
 
 
 
 
 
 
 
 
 
 
 
 
 

Canadian English
English phonology
English language in Canada
Splits and mergers in English phonology
Vowel shifts